Paramoria is a genus of sea snails, marine gastropod mollusks in the family Volutidae.

Species
Species within the genus Paramoria include:

 Paramoria guntheri (Smith, 1886)
 Paramoria johnclarki Bail & Limpus, 1997
 Paramoria weaveri McMichael, 1961

References

Volutidae